Gladies Lariesa Garina Haga Kore (born 26 March 2006) is an Indonesian  diver. She is the youngest Indonesian diver to champion three senior national competitions.

Career 
Gladies Lariesa Garina Haga Kore made her diving competition debut at the 2021 Pekan Olahraga Nasional in Papua, where she won three gold medals. She was the only Indonesian diver competing at the 2022 World Aquatics Championships in Bucharest.

Competition history

Indonesia National Competition

International Competition

References

21st-century Indonesian athletes
Indonesian female divers